Jack Foreman Mantle, VC (12 April 1917 – 4 July 1940) was a sailor in the Royal Navy and a recipient of the Victoria Cross, the highest award for gallantry in the face of the enemy that can be awarded to British and Commonwealth forces.

Early life
Born in Wandsworth, London, on 12 April 1917, Mantle was educated at Taunton's School in Southampton.

Victoria Cross
Mantle was 23 years old, and an acting leading seaman in the Royal Navy during the Second World War when the following deed took place for which he was awarded the Victoria Cross.

Although wounded again many times, he remained at his gun, training and firing by hand when Foylebank'''s electric power failed, until he collapsed and died. His citation in the London Gazette reads:

This was only the second occasion that the Victoria Cross has been awarded for action in the United Kingdom.

Legacy
The Yeovil Sea Cadet unit carries the name T. S. Mantle V. C. in his honour.

A brass memorial detailing the incident and honouring Mantle can be found in Southampton Maritime Museum. It is placed to the left of the main entrance doors. This memorial was originally situated in 'Jack's Corner' at the City's Central Sports Centre – the name remains as a children's play area.

Mantle's VC and other medals are on loan to the Royal Naval Museum in Portsmouth.

In 2021, Mantle was remembered in the form of a new, permanent Portland stone memorial plinth, plaque and bench, overlooking Chesil Beach.  This is situated opposite the Heights Hotel, Portland, Dorset.

References

External links
CWGC entry
Leading Seaman J.F. Mantle in The Art of War exhibition at the UK National Archives
Location of grave and VC medal (Dorset)''
Jack Foreman Mantle at victoriacross.org.uk
Coxswain Edward Palmer, awarded BEM for rescue work. Also photos of the sinking of HMS Foylebank

1917 births
1940 deaths
People from Wandsworth
Royal Navy sailors
Royal Navy personnel killed in World War II
Royal Navy recipients of the Victoria Cross
British World War II recipients of the Victoria Cross
Deaths by airstrike during World War II
Military personnel from London